Derya Yanık (born 1972 in Osmaniye, Turkey) is a Turkish politician and lawyer. In 2021, she became the Turkish Minister of Family and Social Services

Career
She graduated from Istanbul University in the Faculty of Law in 1995 with a BA. Between 2004 and 2014, she was the first woman to preside over the Municipal Council of Istanbul, and in 2006 she acted as the Deputy Mayor of Istanbul, whilst Kadir Topbaş visited London.

Yanık is a member of the Board of Directors of the Foundation for Women and Democracy, and a member of the Justice and Development Party's Central Decision and Executive Board.

References 

Living people
1972 births
Members of the 66th government of Turkey
Istanbul University Faculty of Law alumni
21st-century Turkish women politicians
Turkish women lawyers
20th-century Turkish lawyers